Maternal death in fiction is a common theme encountered in literature, movies, and other media.

The death of a mother during pregnancy, childbirth or immediately afterwards is a tragic event. The chances of a child surviving such an extreme birth are compromised.  In literature, the death of a new mother is a powerful device: it removes one character and places the surviving child into an often hostile environment which has to be overcome.

Literature

11th century
 In Murasaki Shikibu's novel The Tale of Genji, Genji’s first wife, Aoi no Ue was suffering form attacking of Lady Rokujō's spirit during her pregnancy. She died after giving birth to her son Yūgiri.

18th century
 In Cao Xueqin’s novel Dream of the Red Chamber, Xiang Ling, the maid and concubine of Xue Pan, dies in childbirth, giving birth to her daughter Ning Xiner. However, this plot only appears in Gao E's continuation. The original author only demonstrates her fate is death, in a poem.

19th century
 In the Grimm Brothers' Snow White, Snow White's mother died in childbirth. Soon afterwards, her father took a new wife who was beautiful, but very vain, and who possessed supernatural powers.
 In Leo Tolstoy's War and Peace, Liza Bolkonskaya, wife of Prince Andrei dies giving birth to a son called Nikolai.
 In Charles Dickens' novel Oliver Twist the title character's mother, Agnes, dies giving birth to him.
 Another Dickens novel A Christmas Carol, Ebenezer Scrooge's younger sister Fan dies in childbirth giving birth to his nephew Fred. Scrooge's father blames him for his mother also dying in childbirth.
 In the 1891 play Spring Awakening by Frank Wedekind and the same-named contemporary musical Wendla dies from a botched abortion.
 In Jane Austen's Northanger Abbey, the author ridicules the convention of heroines having mothers who die in childbirth, by beginning the novel: "No one who had ever seen Catherine Morland in her infancy would have supposed her born to be a heroine. Her situation in life, the character of her father and mother... were all equally against her... Her mother was a woman of useful plain sense, with a good temper, and, what is more remarkable, with a good constitution. She had three sons before Catherine was born; and instead of dying in bringing the latter into the world, as anybody might expect, she still lived on."
 In Emily Brontë's Wuthering Heights,  Catherine Earnshaw goes into early labor and dies after giving birth to her daughter, Catherine Linton.
 In Elizabeth Gaskell's Mary Barton, when the heroine is a young girl, her mother dies in childbirth along with the baby, deeply affected by the grief of her sister Esther's disappearance, leaving Mary to be brought up by her father.
 Fanny Robin in Thomas Hardy's Far From the Madding Crowd also dies in childbirth along with the child, who was fathered by Frank Troy, Bathsheba's husband.
 In Henry James' Washington Square, Catherine Sloper's mother dies shortly after her birth and the death of his beautiful and talented wife permanently alters Dr Sloper and causes him to be cold and unfeeling towards Catherine.
 Lucetta Farfrae (formerly Lucette Le Sueur) in Thomas Hardy's The Mayor of Casterbridge has a miscarriage and dies, following a seizure induced by the public revelation of her love affair with Michael Henchard.
 In The Brothers Karamazov, published in 1880 by Fyodor Dostoevsky, Stinking Lizaveta dies from childbirth complications.
 In the novella René by François-René de Chateaubriand, the eponymous protagonist's mother dies giving birth to René. This contributes to René's difficult relationship with his estranged father and intense friendship with his sister, and also begins his 'mal du siècle' melancholy which is considered to have defined French Romanticism.

20th century
 Catherine Barkley, the nurse and principal supporting character in Ernest Hemingway's A Farewell to Arms, dies in childbirth shortly after her son is stillborn.
 In Bibhutibhushan Bandopadhyay's 1932 Bengali novel Aparajito, Aparna dies giving birth to her son Kajal, after which the despairing father Apu abandons his child. It was later adapted into the film, The World of Apu.
 In Thornton Wilder's play Our Town, Emily Webb dies in childbirth.
 In Vladimir Nabokov's novel The Real Life of Sebastian Knight Knight's first love, Clare Bishop, later bleeds to death in childbirth "next to an empty cradle".
 The title character dies in childbirth in Nabokov's Lolita, as does Humbert Humbert's first wife.
 In Gabriel García Márquez's novel One Hundred Years of Solitude, Amaranta Ursula Buendía dies while giving birth to Aureliano, the child she has with her nephew Aureliano Babilonia.
 In Barry Hughart's novel The Bridge of Birds, Li Kao's mother dies immediately after giving birth to him. She lives only long enough to ask for Kaoliang wine, which is misinterpreted by those in attendance as naming the child Li Kao.
 In Patricia MacLachlan's Sarah, Plain and Tall, Anna's mother dies a day after Caleb's birth. Afterwards, the two children and their father place an ad in the newspaper for a mail-order bride.
 In Marion Zimmer Bradley's Lady of Avalon, Viviane's mother, Ana, dies while giving birth to her fifth child, Morgause, who is fed and raised by her older sister.
 In Ken Follett's novel The Pillars of the Earth, Tom Builder's wife Agnes dies in childbirth in the woods.
 In the Harry Potter saga, Merope Gaunt-Riddle, the mother of the series' chief antagonist, Lord Voldemort, dies after giving birth to him, living just long enough to name him Tom Marvolo Riddle.
 In Gregory Maguire's novel Wicked Melena dies giving birth to her third child, Shell.
 In P.D. James' mystery novels, her central detective, Adam Dalgliesh, loses his wife and child in childbirth.
 In Revolutionary Road, the female protagonist dies after inducing a miscarriage.
 In the Star Wars novel Darth Bane: Path of Destruction, Darth Bane's mother (whose name is never revealed) died giving birth to him. His father, Hurst blames and even abuses him because of it.
 In the Redwall book Outcast of Redwall, a ferret named Bluefen dies giving birth to her son Veil Sixclaw, while her husband Swartt Sixclaw left him for dead.
 In Lao She’s novel Rickshaw Boy, Tiger girl, the wife of the main character Xiangzi, dies while giving birth, and her child died too.

21st century
 In the final book of Lemony Snicket's A Series of Unfortunate Events book series, the character Kit Snicket dies after giving birth to her daughter (the father of whom is never revealed).
 In the 2003 novel The Kite Runner by Khaled Hosseini, the mother of the protagonist Amir dies during his birth.
 In the Nicholas Sparks novel At First Sight, the female protagonist Lexie Darnell dies giving birth to daughter, Claire.
 In R.A. Salvatore's novel The Highwayman, Sen Wi, realizing that her newborn son will die, uses a healing art to save him at the cost of her own life.
 In George R. R. Martin's series A Song of Ice and Fire, the mother of Tyrion Lannister dies giving birth to him. He is considered responsible for her death by his father and sister throughout his life. In this series, there is also Daenerys Targaryen, whose mother died during her birth. There is also Mance Rayder's wife, Dalla, who dies in childbirth as well.

Film

20th century
 In The Keeper of the Bees, Alice Louise Cameron, portrayed by actress & future spouse of the lieutenant governor of Nevada, Clara Bow, dies from childbirth complications.
 In Satyajit Ray's Bengali film, Apur Sansar (The World of Apu) (1959), Apu's wife Aparna dies during childbirth, after which Apu falls into despair and abandons their child Kajal. Years later, Apu eventually acknowledges Kajal as his son and takes responsibility for his upbringing. It is based on the 1932 Bengali novel Aparajito.
 In Purana Mandir, a family line of women dies from childbirth in 2 centuries
 In the motion picture The Mask of Zorro (1998), the antagonist Don Rafael Montero, enemy of Don Diego de la Vega, lied that Esperanza de la Vega died in childbirth, but Esperanza de la Vega was actually gunned down instead. Then Montero raised her daughter Elena.
 In the science fiction film Contact (1997), a woman died giving birth to the film's protagonist Eleanor Ann "Ellie" Arroway, portrayed by actress Jodie Foster. Arroway's father died when she was nine years old.
 In Mi Familia/My Familia (1995), the wife of the character played by Jimmy Smits dies while giving birth to their son.
 In the Canadian movie The Red Violin (1998), Anna Bussotti dies after a stillbirth in the opening act, leading to the creation of the Red Violin as a tribute.
 In the motion picture Mary Shelley's Frankenstein (1994), Victor Frankenstein's mother dies giving birth to his little brother, William. She dies of illness in the original novel.
 In the horror film The Seventh Sign (1988), Demi Moore's character dies as a result of giving birth to her child. Actually, she offers her soul because "she finds out that the prophecies lead up to the birth of her child who may not survive because there will be no more souls left for the newborns unless someone offers their own."
 In the film adaptation of Interview with the Vampire, the wife of Louis de Pointe du Lac dies in childbirth.
 In the coming-of-age film My Girl (1991), Vada Sultenfuss' mother died a few days after giving birth to her.
 In  Fantaghirò, the queen dies after giving birth to the title character of the film series.
 In Disney's 1994 version of The Jungle Book, Mowgli's mother is said to have died giving birth to him (Mowgli's father Nathoo is later killed by Shere Khan).
 In the supernatural horror film The Craft (1996), Sarah Bailey's mother died while giving birth to her.
 In the Chinese movie To Live (1994), Fengxia, the daughter of the main character Fugui, died while giving birth to her son.

21st century
 In the film Whale Rider (2002), the main character's mother and twin brother die while she lives.
 In the film  Saint Ange (2004), Anna Jurin (Virginie Ledoyen) dies from giving birth to a stillborn child.
 In the film Jersey Girl (2004), Gertrude Steiney, the character of actress Jennifer Lopez, dies during childbirth.
 In the film Star Wars: Episode III – Revenge of the Sith (2005), Padmé Amidala dies after the birth of her twins Luke Skywalker and Leia Organa on Polis Massa, not because of poor health, but because of the complete loss of will to live and a broken heart. Her husband and the father of her children Anakin Skywalker turned to the dark side of the Force and became Darth Vader.
 In the film Pan's Labyrinth (2006), Ofelia's mother, Carmen, dies during the birth of her and Captain Vidal's son.
 In the film Sherlock Holmes (2009), Lord Henery Blackwood, the main antagonist's mother died giving birth to him.
 In the film Space Between Us (2017), Gardner Eliot, the main protagonist's mother, died during childbirth shortly after landing on Mars.
 In the animated film Nahuel and the Magic Book (2020), Consuelo, the protagonist's mother, died by giving birth of the protagonist, Nahuel, in the fishing boat during the middle of the storm with her husband who was headed to the hospital.

Other media

Anime, comics, and video games
 In manga and anime series One Piece, Ace's mother Portgas D. Rouge died from exhaustion after giving birth to Ace, due to bearing him  for 20 months.
 In the 1980s manga and anime series Kimagure Orange Road, Kyosuke's mother Akemi died shortly after giving birth to his twin sisters Manami and Kurumi.
 Square Enix's Dragon Quest and Final Fantasy series of video games have mentioned maternal death in several games:
 In Dragon Quest V (1993), Martha, the mother of the game's protagonist, was rumored to have died in childbirth.
 In Final Fantasy VI (1994), Gau's mother dies from childbirth, which causes his father to lose his sanity and leave Gau in the Veldt.
 In the 2007 remake, Cecil's mother died giving birth to him.
 In Final Fantasy VIII (1999), Raine died giving birth to the protagonist Squall Leonhart.
 In SNK's King of Fighters video game series, the Yagami bloodline is cursed with maternal death.  The mothers of the Yagami clan heirs are cursed to die giving birth to the clan heirs.
 In the 1997 manga series Mobile Suit Gundam Wing: Episode Zero, Quatre Raberba Winner's mother Quatrina died giving birth to him.
 In manga and anime series Naruto, Gaara's mother Karura dies giving birth to him.
 In the 1998 video game Metal Gear Solid, Psycho Mantis' mother died in childbirth, prompting his father to blame him for her death.
 In Key's 2004 visual novel Clannad, Nagisa dies of a constant fever while giving birth to Ushio, after which the father Tomoya falls into depression and gives his daughter away to Nagisa's parents. Five years later, Tomoya eventually takes responsibility for Ushio's upbringing, but the latter catches her mother's fever and dies as well. Then time is altered to where Nagisa survives giving birth and lives a happier life with her husband and daughter. It was later adapted into a film and anime series.
 In the film adaptation, Nagisa doesn't come back to life.
 In the video game Jade Empire, Sky's wife dies giving birth to their daughter, Pinmei, years before he meets the player.
 In the webcomic, Kevin and Kell, Wanda Woolstone dies giving birth to Corrie Dewclaw. Her death causes the otherwise very skilled Ralph Dewclaw, Corrie's father, to lose the will to hunt, and causes him to mistakenly believe that predator-prey relationships inevitably end tragically.
 In the game Fallout 3, the player's mother dies when giving birth to him/her.
 In this anime Kiddy Girl-and, Eclipse was Q-Feuille's mother, who died giving birth to her.
 In the 2017 video game What Remains of Edith Finch, the titular character Edith Finch dies from giving birth to Christopher.
 In Marvel Comics, N'Yami, T'Challa's mother, dies as a result of his birth.
 In Fire Emblem: Three Houses, Byleth's mother, Sitri, gave them her Crest Stone to save their life shortly after giving birth to them.

Live-action television
 In the MTV series Teen Wolf it is revealed that Jackson Whittemore's birth parents, Gordon and Margret Miller, died in a car crash on June 14, 1995, and the doctors kept Margret on life support long enough to deliver Jackson via emergency c-section
 In an episode of House, a woman 26 weeks pregnant dies after doctors perform an emergency c-section. Another one dies from eclampsia following delivery.
 In the television series Lost, the character Ben Linus' mother died while giving birth to him and his father blames him for it.
 In the series one ER episode "Loves Labours Lost", Mark Greene oversees a patient who dies in childbirth due to pre-eclampsia. Mark is subsequently sued for negligence by her partner.
 In the soap opera spin-off General Hospital: Night Shift, HIV-positive pregnant woman Stacey Sloan dies after complications of placental abruption.
 In Gossip Girl, the anti-hero Chuck Bass' mother allegedly died after giving birth to him.
 In Empresses in the Palace, there are two characters die after childbirth. Empress Chunyuan dies after giving birth to a stillborn son, but she only appeared in the dialogues of the Emperor’s memories. Shen Meizhuang, also known as Consort Hui, dies after giving birth to her daughter Princess Jinghe as well
 In Mad Men, the protagonist Don Draper's mother died while giving birth to him.
 In Downton Abbey,  Lady Sybil Branson dies from eclampsia after giving birth to her daughter Sybil.
 In the Filipino drama, Kadenang Ginto, Jessa Trinidad dies immediately after a vaginal birth.
 In the Australian Drama,  McLeod's Daughters, Prudence Lachlan dies after giving birth to Adam John McLeod who died with her.
 In the Netflix series  Chilling Adventures of Sabrina, Lady Constance Blackwood dies in Childbirth.
 In the sitcom television series The Golden Girls, and its spin-off The Golden Palace, Ingrid Kerklavoner died giving birth to Rose Nylund.

Cartoons and animated films
 In Rugrats, Melinda Finster is implied to have died of an unknown illness soon after giving birth to her son Chuckie, as it was mentioned in Mother's Day that she was hospitalized and kept a journal, the final entry of which she had written a poem.
 The film Khumba features Lungisa who died the next day from an illness after giving birth to Khumba.
 In the cartoon Steven Universe, Steven's mother Rose Quartz may have died giving birth to him, as her husband Greg Universe, Steven's father, said she "gave up her physical form to bring Steven into the world". However, it was later elaborated on that, due to being a crystal gem, she and, her son, Steven couldn't exist at the same time in the same world, leaving her exist as half of Steven.
 In Sofia the First, Princess Amber and Prince James' mother dies after giving birth to them.
 The Annecy-nominated film Nahuel and the Magic Book (2020), At the beginning of the film, Consuelo, the protagonist's mother, died by giving birth of Nahuel in the fishing boat during the middle of the storm with her husband who was headed to the hospital.

See also
 Maternal death

References

Fiction